Lieutenant-General Philip Anstruther (bap. 26 July 1682 – 11 November 1760), of Airdrie House, Fife, was a professional soldier from Scotland and Member of Parliament between 1715 and 1754. He was a controversial Lieutenant Governor of Menorca.

Personal details
Philip Anstruther was baptised at Edinburgh on July 26 1682, only son of Sir James Anstruther of Airdrie House, in Fife, and his wife Katherine Skene; his father, a lawyer and Clerk of the Bills in the Parliament of Scotland, died the same year.

He died unmarried on 11 November 1760 and left his estate to his cousin, Sir John Anstruther, 2nd Baronet.

Career
There are few details available on Anstruther's military career and it is not clear if he ever saw action; in 1710, he was appointed Captain in the Foot Guards, but these positions were based in London and often required little military service. In 1720, he purchased the colonelcy of the Cameronians, which he retained until his death. Regiments and commissions were then considered private assets and particularly at the senior levels did not require service.

The Anstruthers were an important family in Fife and his cousin Sir John controlled the constituency of Anstruther Burghs. At the 1715 British general election, Sir John was elected MP for Fife and Philip took over Anstruther Burghs, which he retained until defeated in 1741. His only recorded vote was in 1737, when he was the only Scottish MP to support government reprisals against Edinburgh over the Porteous Riots; although ultimately never passed, this allegedly made him "an object of detestation among his countrymen".

In 1733, Anstruther was appointed Lieutenant Governor of Menorca, an important British naval base in the Mediterranean Sea taken from Spain in 1708. Although he spent little time there, this was not unusual, but while many similar positions were accepted as sinecures, Menorca was vital for control of the Western Mediterranean, vulnerable to attack and absenteeism an ongoing problem. Following his defeat in 1741, Anstruther was summoned before a Parliamentary committee to explain his long absence from duty; although he admitted neglecting his duties, he narrowly escaped censure.

On returning to Menorca in 1742, Anstruther court-martialled his subordinate, Henry Erskine, for a supposed conspiracy against him; Erskine was acquitted and became a bitter political enemy. Since MPs were now barred from holding overseas military commands, Anstruther resigned as Lieutenant Governor and was returned for Anstruther Burghs at the 1747 British general election. However, much of his time was spent defending his activities at Menorca and he was heavily criticised in a Privy Council report. He was also attacked by Erskine, now in Parliament and seeking revenge; in the 1754 British general election, Erskine ran against him at Anstruther Burghs and won, ending his political career.

References

Sources
 
 
 
 
 
 

1680s births
1760 deaths
Military personnel from Edinburgh
British Army lieutenant generals
Members of the Parliament of Great Britain for Scottish constituencies
British MPs 1715–1722
British MPs 1722–1727
British MPs 1727–1734
British MPs 1734–1741
British MPs 1747–1754
Grenadier Guards officers
Cameronians officers
Philip